= Aaryan Banthia =

Indian singer

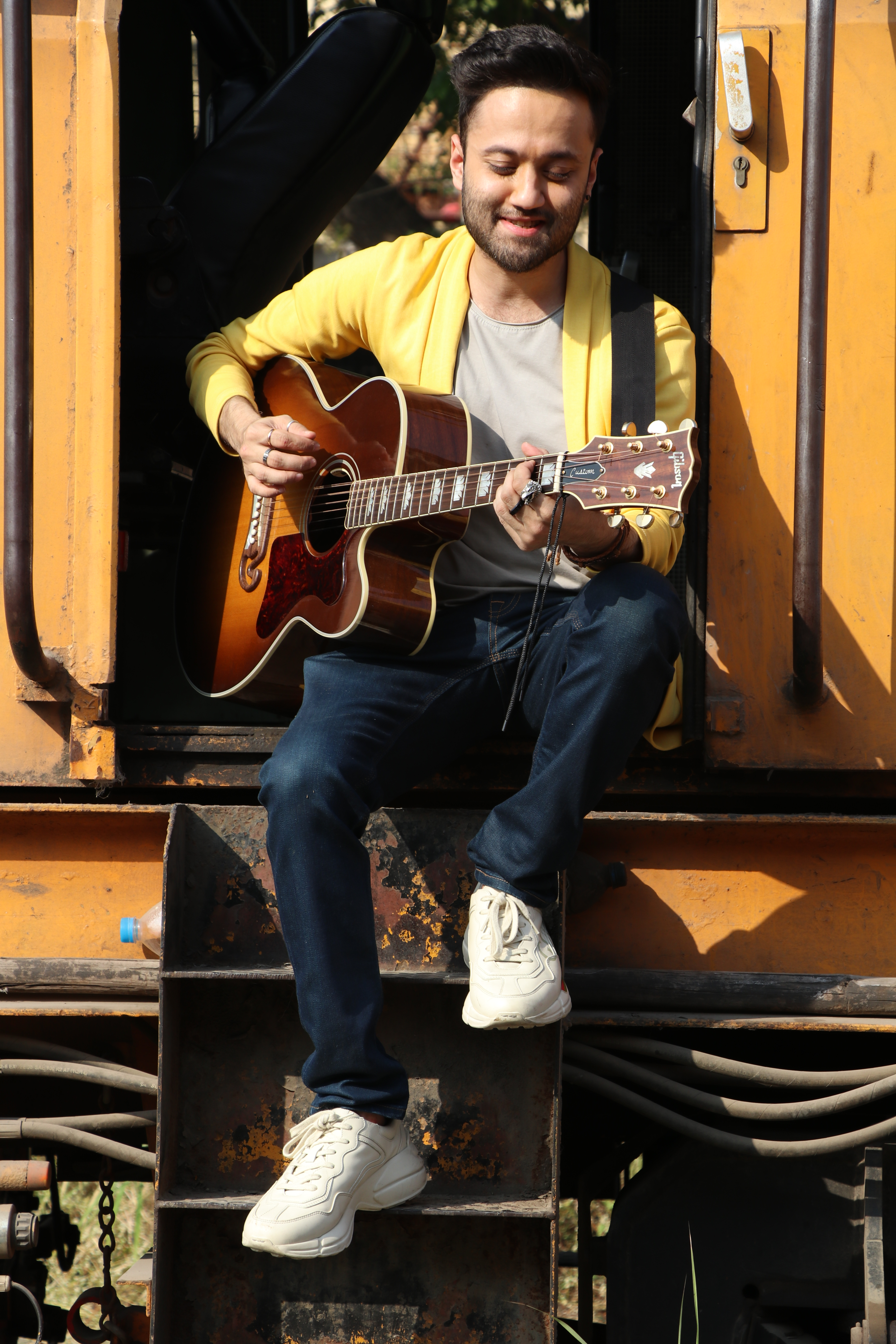
- Born: 12 February 1994 (age 32)
- Occupations: Singer-Guitarist, Composer, Record producer

Aaryan Banthia (born 12 February 1994) is an Indian singer-guitarist, composer and record producer presently based in Mumbai. He released his first single "Yaadein'" in October 2019 with Zee Music Company.

== Biography ==
Banthia was born on the 12th of February 1994 in Kolkata, West Bengal At 14, his father bought him an Indian made Hobner acoustic Guitar. He studied at Cardiff Metropolitan University in Wales, where he began performing as a singer at university venues. He then decided to become a professional musician.

After returning to India, Banthia released his first single "Yaadein" with Zee Music Company. The song gained more than one million views on YouTube. He released another single, "Back in the Day" in 2020.
